The Donoho School is a private school in Anniston, Alabama that was honored by the Blue Ribbon Schools Program in 2005. The Donoho School serves students in grades PK through 12.

History

The Anniston Academy was founded as a secondary institution in 1963 and renamed in 1976. The present Lower Division was founded as The Episcopal Day School in 1961 as an independent elementary school. Housed originally in the facilities of St. Michael and All Angels Episcopal Church (Anniston, Alabama), the school moved into Grace Episcopal Church in 1967.

In 1970, headmaster Allan Strand attributed the school's growth to white parents fleeing racially integrated public schools. In 1976, Anniston Academy was primarily white but had several black students.

In 1976 the name was changed to The Donoho School in recognition of Mrs. Harriet Wallis Donoho, a founder and benefactor of the school. In 1983, then headmaster Tom Potts said they the name change was also motivated by a desire to distance the school from similarly named all white segregation academies that had opened in other Alabama cities

In the summer of 1976, The Episcopal Day School merged with The Donoho School and became the Lower Division. In 1980 the Lower and Middle Divisions moved into a new facility constructed on the Donoho campus and The Donoho Upper School divided to become a Middle Division, containing grades seven and eight, and an Upper Division for grades nine through twelve.

In 1981, the headmaster said the school was not a segregation academy and would like to enroll more black students.

In 1989, the Middle Division moved into a new facility constructed adjacent to the Upper Division. This expansion allowed the school to offer two sections per grade in kindergarten through grade twelve. Further additions in the early childhood department have brought the school to its current status of two sections in pre-kindergarten through grade twelve.

Facilities 
The Donoho School  campus is located in the foothills of the southern Appalachian Mountains.

References 

Private elementary schools in Alabama
Private middle schools in Alabama
Private high schools in Alabama
Buildings and structures in Anniston, Alabama
Educational institutions established in 1963
Schools in Calhoun County, Alabama
Preparatory schools in Alabama
1963 establishments in Alabama